No. 1422 (Night Fighter) Flight was an independent Royal Air Force flight, used to test night fighting techniques and tactics.

History
The unit started originally as No. 422 (Fighter Interception) Flight, formed on 14 October 1940 at RAF Shoreham to study the use of single-seat night fighters That unit went up into No. 96 Squadron RAF on 18 December 1940.

The unit was reformed as No. 1422 (Night Fighter) Flight at RAF Heston on 12 May 1941, equipped with a variety of night fighters for trials and experimental work. Tactics were developed here for the Turbinlite Douglas Havoc and Turbinlite de Havilland Mosquito, as well as radar equipped aircraft. The flight was disbanded on 3 June 1944 to become the Special Projectile Flight of the Royal Aircraft Establishment.

References

Notes

Bibliography

 Lake, Alan. Flying Units of the RAF. Shrewsbury, Shropshire, UK: Airlife Publishing Ltd., 1999. .
 Sturtivant, Ray, ISO and John Hamlin. RAF Flying Training And Support Units since 1912. Tonbridge, Kent, UK: Air-Britain (Historians) Ltd., 2007. .

1422 Flight
Military units and formations established in 1941